The ninth and final season of the Dragon Ball Z anime series contains the Fusion, Kid Buu and Peaceful World arcs, which comprises Part 3 of the Buu Saga. It originally ran from February 1995 to January 1996 in Japan on Fuji Television. The first English airing of the series was on Cartoon Network where Funimation Entertainment dub of the series ran from October 2002 to April 2003.

Funimation released the season in a box set on May 19, 2009 and  announced that they would be re-releasing Dragon Ball Z in a new seven volume set called the "Dragon Boxes". Based on the original series masters with frame-by-frame restoration, the first set was released on November 10, 2009.


Episode list

References

1995 Japanese television seasons
1996 Japanese television seasons
Z (season 9)